The Christian Record Building is a historic two-story building in Lincoln, Nebraska. It was built with red bricks and limestone in 1936, and designed in the Art Deco style. It housed the Christian Record Services for the Blind, a ministry of the Seventh-day Adventist Church. It is located west of the campus of Union College, a college affiliated with the church. It has been listed on the National Register of Historic Places since December 1, 1986.

References

National Register of Historic Places in Lincoln, Nebraska
Art Deco architecture in Nebraska
Buildings and structures completed in 1936
1936 establishments in Nebraska
Seventh-day Adventist Church